Yuying School may refer to:

Yuying Secondary School, Singapore
Beijing No. 25 Middle School, formerly Yuying School
Yuying School, a predecessor of Zhejiang University
Zhenze Middle School, Suzhou, China, formerly Yuying School
The Second Yuying Foreign Languages School of Nanjing